The 2016 Miami-Dade County mayoral election took place on November 8, 2016. After a primary on August 30, incumbent Mayor Carlos A. Giménez defeated Miami-Dade School Board member Raquel Regalado on November 8. The election was officially nonpartisan. The race was marred by controversy, including attempts by Regalado to take Giménez off the ballot and accusations that Giménez was responsible for flyers suggesting Regalado was in association with then Republican Presidential nominee Donald Trump.

Candidates

Advanced to runoff 

 Carlos A. Giménez, mayor of Miami-Dade County (Republican Party)
 Raquel Regalado, Miami-Dade School Board member (Republican Party)

Eliminated in primary
 Frederick Bryant, printer (Democratic Party)
 Benjamin "B. J." Chiszar, former chair of the Miami-Dade County Democratic Party (Democratic Party)
 Miguel A. Eizmendiz, former political consultant (Independent)
Farid Khavari, former gubernatorial candidate in 2010 and 2014 (Democratic Party)
 Alfred Santamaria, former staffer for David Rivera (Republican Party)

Declined
 Jean Monestime, Chairman of County Commission (Democratic Party)
 Xavier Suarez, County Commissioner and former mayor of Miami (Independent)

Primary election

General election

References

Mayoral elections in Miami-Dade County, Florida
2016 Florida elections
Miami-Dade